Ronald Ralph Pruitt (born October 21, 1951) is a former professional baseball player. He played all or part of nine seasons in Major League Baseball for the Texas Rangers (1975), Cleveland Indians (1976–80 and 1981), Chicago White Sox (1980) and San Francisco Giants (1982–83). Primarily an outfielder, he also played substantially at catcher.

After attending Flint Central High School, Pruitt was drafted out of Michigan State University by the Rangers in 1972. In 9 seasons he played in 341 games and had 795 at bats, 88 runs scored, 214 hits, 28 doubles, 4 triples, 12 home runs, 92 RBI, 8 stolen bases, 94 walks (7 intentional), a .269 batting average, a .345 on-base percentage, a .360 slugging percentage, 286 total bases, 7 sacrifice hits, and 7 sacrifice flies. 

Pruitt was traded along with Stan Thomas from the Rangers to the Indians for John Ellis at the Winter Meetings on December 9, 1975. 

On September 9th, 1982, Ron had a late-season ninth inning walk-off single to overcome a 6-5 deficit to give the Giants a 7-6 win over the Astros in the midst of a division race.

References

External links

1951 births
Living people
Major League Baseball left fielders
Major League Baseball right fielders
Major League Baseball catchers
Texas Rangers players
Cleveland Indians players
Chicago White Sox players
San Francisco Giants players
Denver Bears players
Flint Central High School alumni
Fort Myers Sun Sox players
Spokane Indians players
Pittsfield Rangers players
Toledo Mud Hens players
Charleston Charlies players
Phoenix Giants players
Portland Beavers players
Michigan State Spartans baseball players
Baseball players from Flint, Michigan
All-American college baseball players
Anchorage Glacier Pilots players